Yungay is a town in the Ancash Region in north central Peru, South America.

Geography
Yungay is located in the Callejón de Huaylas on Río Santa at an elevation of approximately 2,500 meters, 450 km north of Lima, the country's capital. East of the small town are the mountain ridges of snow-covered Cordillera Blanca, with Huascarán, Peru's highest mountain, no more than 15 km east of Yungay.

Yungay is the capital of Yungay Province, as well as the main town in the Yungay District. While the town counts approximately 10,000 inhabitants (2010 projection based on 2007 census data) Yungay Province has a population of 60,000 (2000 estimate). The Province of Yungay occupies part of the Callejón de Huaylas, the Conchucos Valley (Yanama), the coast of Ancash (Quillo) and the Huascarán National Park.

History
The "Restoration" army, a Chilean-Peruvian army during the War of the Confederation, defeated the army of the Peru-Bolivian Confederation during the Battle of Yungay on 20 January 1839, marking the dissolution of the short-lived confederacy.

1962 avalanche
On 11 January 1962 an avalanche from Huascarán destroyed Ranrahirca and eight other villages in which an estimated 4,000 were killed. Yungay was saved.

Ancash earthquake

In 1962, two American scientists, David Bernays and Charles Sawyer, had reported seeing a massive vertical slab of rock being undermined by a glacier on mount Huascarán Norte, which threatened to fall and cause the obliteration of Yungay. According to Sawyer, when this was reported in the Expreso newspaper (27 September 1962), the government ordered them to retract or face prison, and they fled the country. Citizens were forcibly prevented from speaking of an impending disaster. Eight years later, the prediction came true.

On 31 May 1970, the Ancash earthquake caused a substantial part of the north side of a mountain, Nevado Huascarán, to collapse and an unstable mass of glacial ice about 800 meters across at the top of Nevado Huascarán to fall. This caused a debris avalanche, burying the town of Yungay and killing 20,000 people (400 survived). More than 50 million cubic meters of debris slid approximately 15 kilometers downhill at an angle of about 14 degrees. Speeds between 340 mph to 620 mph were achieved. Most of the survivors were in the cemetery and stadium at the time of the earthquake, as these zones were the highest in town.

The Peruvian government has forbidden excavation in the area where the old town of Yungay is buried, declaring it a national cemetery.

See also
Ancash Region
Yungay Province

References

Further reading
 , Anthony  (1986): The Martyred City: Death and Rebirth in the Andes. Albuquerque: University of New Mexico Press 
 , Alan (1999): Peru Handbook. Bath: Footprint

External links
Caves
 Guitarrero caves near Yungay (Peru). First agriculture evidence of Peru 10,000 years ago (maps and photographs)

Earthquake of 31 May 1970
  Earthquake 31 May 1970 (chimboteonline)
  Earthquake 31 May 1970 (yungayperu.com, with details and photos of the catastrophe)

Cities destroyed by earthquakes
Former populated places in Peru
Populated places in the Ancash Region
20th-century avalanches
Earthquakes in Peru
1970 in Peru